Giorgia Fiorio (born 23 July 1967, in Turin) is a photographer, artist, and essayist from Turin, Italy.

As a teenager, she was a pop singer, and performed at the San Remo Festival. At age twenty, she decided she wanted to be a photographer. She attended the International Center of Photography in New York City.

In 1995, Fiorio won the $10,000 Ernst Haas Prize for her documentary work. In 1997, Fiorio was named Documentary Photographer of the Year by the magazine American Photography.

Discography

Albums 
 1984 - Giorgia Fiorio (LP)
 1986 - Giorgia (LP)
 1988 - Prende al cuore (LP)

Singles 

 1982 - Bimbo / Segreti
 1983 - Avrò / Segreti
 1983 - Un'altra estate / Indovinare
 1984 - Se ti spogli / Bimbo
 1986 - Pirates of Love / Take It or Leave It
 1986 - Tell Me Why / Take It or Leave It
 1986 - "Pirate of love" / "Pirate of love" (instrumental version)
 1986 - "Take it or leave it" / "Pirate of love" (Radio version)
 1987 - Rock Show / Clip Show
 1987 - "Rock Show" / "You're the First the Last My Everything"
 1988 - Io con te / Prende al cuore

Books

References 

Italian women photographers
21st-century Italian photographers
20th-century Italian photographers
Artists from Turin
1967 births
Living people
20th-century Italian women artists
21st-century Italian women artists
20th-century Italian singers